The United Kingdom National Renewable Energy Action Plan is the National Renewable Energy Action Plan (NREAP) for the United Kingdom. The plan was commissioned by the Directive 2009/28/EC which required Member States of the European Union to notify the European Commission with a road map. The report describes how the United Kingdom planned to achieve its legally binding target of a 15% share of energy from renewable sources in gross final energy consumption by 2020.

Main targets in UK 
The history of energy production in the UK has been based on natural resources of fossil fuels. This means that UK has not been as active in exploitation of renewable resources. Compared to many other Member States, the UK is starting from a very low level of renewable energy consumption and thus the challenge of meeting the 2020 targets is even greater.

The Renewable Energy Directive (2009) sets a target for the UK to achieve 15% of its energy consumption from renewable sources by 2020. This compares to only 1.5% in 2005. There has been a small increase in renewable energy use in recent years; there must be a much greater level of deployment over the next decade in order to meet the target.

The share of RES heat in 2005 was 0,48 ktoe and will increase up to 6,2 Mtoe. The share will increase from 0,7% to 12%.  Bioenergy in 2020 will still have the biggest share of RES heat and the amount would be 3,6 Mtoe with a seven-fold increase.
The consumption of RES electricity was 2005 1,5 TWh and the share 4,7%.  The target for RES electricity for 2020 is 116 TWh. This means a several times increase. The biggest share will come from wind power (78 TWh and capacity 2800 MW). The bioelectricity would be 20,6 TWh and from biogas 5,6 TWh. The increase for biomass would be five-fold and for biogas 120%.

The RES in the traffic sector in 2005 was 0,188 Mtoe and the increase would be really massive, up to 4,5 Mtoe, in 2020. The share would increase from 0,2% to 10,17%. The consumption of ethanol use would be 1,7 Mtoe and biodiesel use would be 2,5 Mtoe.

See also 

 Energy in the United Kingdom

References

External links 
 National Renewable Energy Action Plan for the United Kingdom

Renewable energy policy
Action plans